The Nanjing Ring Expressway, designated as G2503, is ring expressway in Nanjing, Jiangsu, China.

History
The first section was opened to traffic on 7 October 2005 which included opening of the Nanjing Dashengguan Yangtze River Bridge. The Ninglian Expressway (Ninghuai Expressway) section was opened to traffic 18 on December 2006, the southeast section was opened to traffic on 30 September 2010, and the whole expressway was opened to traffic on 24 December 2012. Several sections of the expressway runs concurrently with the G25, G40 and G42 expressways.

References

Chinese national-level expressways
Expressways in Jiangsu
Transport in Nanjing